Sanjay Gupta (born 1969) is an American neurosurgeon and medical reporter.

Sanjay Gupta may also refer to:

Sanjay Gupta MD, a CNN medical news program he hosts
Sanjay Gupta (businessman) (born 1963), Indian CEO of the Neesa Group
Sanjay Gupta (comics) (born 1966), Indian comic book writer and editor
Sanjay Gupta (director) (born 1969), Bollywood writer and director
Sanjay Gupta (politician), Indian politician
Sanjay Gupta (business executive), Indian business executive
 Sanjay Gupta, Editor & CEO of Jagran Prakashan Limited, publishers of Dainik Jagran
 Sanjay Gupta MD, cardiologist. York, England